The 2015–16 Miami RedHawks men's basketball team represented Miami University during the 2015–16 NCAA Division I men's basketball season. The RedHawks, led by fourth year head coach John Cooper, played their home games at Millett Hall, as members of the East Division of the Mid-American Conference. They finished the season 13–20, 6–12 in MAC play to finish in fifth place in the East Division. They defeated Ball State in the first round of the MAC tournament to advance to the quarterfinals where they lost to Buffalo.

Previous season
The RedHawks finished the season 13–19, 8–10 in MAC play to finish in fifth place in the East Division. They lost in the first round of the MAC tournament to Eastern Michigan.

Departures

Incoming Transfers

Recruiting class of 2015
Note: There were no recruiting class of 2015 for Miami (OH).

Recruiting class of 2016

Roster

Schedule
Source: 

|-
!colspan=9 style="background:#CE1126; color:white;"| Exhibition

|-
!colspan=9 style="background:#CE1126; color:white;"| Non-conference regular season

|-
!colspan=9 style="background:#CE1126; color:white;"| MAC regular season

|-
!colspan=9 style="background:#CE1126; color:white;"| MAC tournament

References

Miami
Miami RedHawks men's basketball seasons